The Deutsche Akademie der Darstellenden Künste (German Academy of the Performing Arts) is an academy founded in Hamburg in 1956, representing members from theatre, film, television and radio. Their activities and events are supported by foundations, the public sector, broadcasters and sponsors. The location moved to Frankfurt in 1962, and to Bensheim in 2004. The academy awards prizes including the Gertrud-Eysoldt-Ring and the Förderpreis für Regie.

History 
Erwin Piscator was the first president of the academy, which was conceived as workshop and for education, but the teaching aspect was not realised. It was first based in Hamburg. In 1962 it moved to Frankfurt am Main. Weeks of experimental theatre calle Experimenta were organised in 1966, 1967, 1969, 1971 and 1975.

When Frankfurt withdrew its financial support, the academy moved to Bensheim, where the prizes Gertrud-Eysoldt-Ring and the  had already been awarded.

External links 
 

Arts organisations based in Germany
1956 establishments in Germany